The Worth County School District is a public school district in Worth County, Georgia, United States, based in Sylvester. It serves the communities of Poulan, Sumner, Sylvester, and Warwick.

Schools
The Worth County School District has two elementary schools, one middle school, and one high school.

Elementary schools
Worth County Elementary School (Steven Rouse, Principal)
Worth County Primary School (Jared Worthy, Principal)

Middle school
Worth County Middle School (Jacque Walker, Interim Principal)

High school
Worth County High School (Melissa Edwards, Principal)

References

External links

School districts in Georgia (U.S. state)
Education in Worth County, Georgia